

List of countries

Northern Africa